Afroeurydemus uniformis is a species of leaf beetle reported from the Republic of the Congo and Democratic Republic of the Congo. It was first described from Garamba National Park by Brian J. Selman in 1972. Its host plants include Rubiaceae, Cyperus papyrus and Ficus vallis-choudae.

References 

Eumolpinae
Beetles of Africa
Insects of the Republic of the Congo
Beetles of the Democratic Republic of the Congo
Beetles described in 1972